Aratidecthes is an extinct genus of crustaceans.

References

External links
 Aratidecthes at the Paleobiology Database

Prehistoric Malacostraca
Prehistoric crustacean genera
Fossil taxa described in 1969